Change of Scenes is an album by saxophonist Stan Getz, Francy Boland and the Kenny Clarke/Francy Boland Big Band which was released on the Verve label in 1971.

Reception

The Allmusic review by Richard S. Ginell stated: "Not only was this Getz's most adventurous session since Focus and the first few bossa nova records, it was very much out of character for Boland, who usually played it safer than this".

Track listing
All compositions by Francy Boland.
 "Extravagances" - 6:01
 "Symptones" - 5:47
 "Quiproquos" - 9:17
 "Escarmouches" - 4:46
 "Touchstone" - 6:33
 "Provocations" - 6:34

Personnel 
Stan Getz - tenor saxophone
Francy Boland - piano,  arranger
Kenny Clarke - drums
Benny Bailey, Art Farmer, Rick Kiefer, Manfred Schoof, Ack van Rooyen - trumpet, flugelhorn
Erik van Lier, Albert Mangelsdorff, Åke Persson - trombone
Herb Geller - alto saxophone, flute, oboe, English horn
Ronnie Scott - tenor saxophone
Stan Sulzmann - tenor saxophone, flute, soprano saxophone
Tony Coe - tenor saxophone, clarinet
Sahib Shihab - baritone saxophone, flute, soprano saxophone
Jean Warland - bass
Tony Inzalaco - percussion

References 

1971 albums
Stan Getz albums
Verve Records albums
Kenny Clarke/Francy Boland Big Band albums